Skimmia anquetilia is a species of shrub that is cultivated for its decorative fruits and bright pink flowers. It is grown mainly in gardens. It can tolerate frost. Several cultivars were created from this species. It is native to the Himalayas. It has been hybridized with  Skimmia japonica to make Skimmia × confusa. A recent report on Skimmia anquetilia shows that the leaves of Skimmia anquetilia are rich in antioxidants and can be use as an antioxidant supplement. The leaves combined with turmeric are used for the treatment of swellings and rheumatism. Powder from its bark is used for the healing of burns and wounds. Its leaves are also used for the treatment of headache and smallpox as well as for freshness.

External links
Skimmia anquetilia info

anquetilia